Elbrus Abbasov (1950 – 14 December 2020) was an Azerbaijani professional footballer.

Honours

Individual
Soviet First League Top Scorer (1): 1976

Death 
On 14 December 2020, Elbrus Abbasov died from complications related to COVID-19 during the COVID-19 pandemic in Azerbaijan.

References

1950 births
2020 deaths
Sportspeople from Agdam
Soviet footballers
Association football forwards
Soviet Top League players
Qarabağ FK players
Kapaz PFK players
Neftçi PFK players
Soviet Azerbaijani people
Deaths from the COVID-19 pandemic in Azerbaijan
Qarabağ FK managers
Footballers from Agdam